about 9300 species of vascular plant were known to grow in Turkey. By comparison, Europe as a whole contains only about 24% more species (about 11500), despite having thirteen times the area.

The most important reasons for the high plant biodiversity are believed to be the relatively high proportion of endemics, together with the high variety of soils and climate of Turkey.

Endemism 

A third of Turkish plant species are endemic to Turkey: one reason there are so many is because the surface of Anatolia is both mountainous and quite fragmented. In fact, the Anatolian mountains resemble archipelagos like the famous Galapagos Islands. Since Darwin we know that geographic isolation between islands or separated mountains is an important means of speciation, leading to high spatial diversity. For Anatolia this assumption is confirmed by concentrations of endemism on highly isolated and relatively old massifs such as Uludağ and Ilgaz Dağ, whereas very young volcanic cones such as Erciyes Dağ and Hassan Dağ are surprisingly poor in endemics. As local endemics take a long time to evolve, we also have to compare the history of the central and north European mountains with the Anatolian ones. During each of the glacial periods the former were covered by thick shields of permanent ice, which destroyed most pre-glacial endemism and hindered neo-endemics from forming. Only less glaciated, peripheral areas, the so-called “massifs de refuge”, offered suitable conditions for the survival of local endemics during glacial periods. 
In Anatolia the Pleistocene glaciations only covered the highest peaks, so there are many species with small ranges. In other words: Anatolia as a whole is a big “massif de refuge”, showing all degrees of past and recent speciation.

Ecologic diversity 

For a visitor from Central Europe, climatic diversity within Turkey is quite astonishing. All climatic zones present in Europe can be found in Turkey on a somewhat smaller scale. The Black Sea coast is humid all year round, with the highest rainfall between Rize and Hopa. South of the Pontic Range there is much less rain so Central Anatolia is dry; also it is cold in the winter. Approaching the southern and western coasts, the climate turns more and more Mediterranean, with mild but very rainy winters and dry, hot summers. This simple scheme is complicated a lot by the mountainous surface of Anatolia. On the high mountains, harsh climatic conditions persist all the year round and, there are glaciers in Turkey, for example on Mount Ararat.

Also Anatolia’s diversity of soils is astonishingly high. Saline soils are quite common in the driest parts of central Anatolia: and also the Aras valley between Kağızman and Armenia is full of impressive salt outlets, some pouring directly out of the mountains and thus resembling snow patches from a distance. South of Sivas and around Gürün there are extensive gypsum hills with a very special flora. A further lot of endemics have been described from the extensive serpentine areas in South-West Anatolia, especially Sandras Dağ (Cicekbaba D.) near Köyceğiz.

The Anatolian diagonal is an ecological dividing line that runs slant-wise across central and eastern Turkey from the northeastern corner of the Mediterranean Sea to the southeastern part of the Black Sea. Many species of plants that exist west of the diagonal are not present to the east, while others found to the east are not in the west. Of 550 species analysed, 135 were found to be "eastern" and 228 "western". Besides the Anatolian diagonal forming a barrier to floral biodiversity, about four hundred species of plant are endemic to the diagonal itself.

Main components of the Turkish flora 

 

With almost 400 species the genus Astragalus (milk-vetch, goat's-thorn; Fabaceae) has by far the most species of the Turkish flora; as historically humans have dramatically expanded its favored treeless, dry and heavily grazed habitats. But not as many as Central Asia: the former USSR has twice as many. The plasticity of this genus is astonishingly high. Depending on environmental conditions a big variety of life forms evolved, ranging from tiny annuals to small woody and thorny bushes. Speciation seems to be in plain progress in Astragalus. Nearly all of its different sections consists of clusters of closely related species whose determination is one of the hardest tasks in a closer study of the Anatolian flora. One of the most successful growth forms of Turkish Astragali is the thorn cushion, which is very characteristic of the dry mountains of inner Anatolia. Such thorn cushions were not exclusively invented by many Astragali. Really striking examples of convergent evolution are the impressive thorn cushions of Onobrychis cornuta, also belonging to the Fabaceae. But there are a lot of thorn cushions also in Acantholimon (Plumbaginaceae). Even some Asteraceae (in Turkey e.g. Centaurea urvillei, C. iberica) and Caryophyllaceae (e.g. Minuartia juniperina) evolved in that direction. 
Second in importance comes Verbascum (Scrophulariaceae) and third is Centaurea (Asteraceae). For Verbascum Turkey evidently is the centre of distribution. Of approximately 360 species worldwide no less than 232 are to be found in Turkey, almost 80% of them being Anatolian endemics! Most Verbascum species are protected against water loss and hungry cattle by a dense cover of tree-shaped micro hairs. Centaurea species rarely have woolly hairs, but in defence against heavy grazing developed thorny phyllaries, or evolved to have no visible stem or a very short one.

Vegetation 

The Pontic mountain range along the north Anatolian coast is a more or less continuous barrier against humid air from the Black Sea, causing high precipitation on the northern slopes of the Pontus all year. Climatic conditions on the northern coast therefore resemble those in central Europe and so does the vegetation. A limited Mediterranean influence is noticeable only on a very narrow coastal strip, but almost completely missing in the northeast. In the lower forest zone often Hornbeam (Carpinus betulus) prevails, frequently intermingled with Sweet Chestnut (Castanea sativa). Further up Oriental Beech (Fagus orientalis) and/or Nordmann Fir (Abies nordmanniana) form extensive forests. Humidity becomes extremely high in Lazistan, where the Pontic barrier culminates in the nearly 4000 m high Kaçkar Mountains. East of Trabzon therefore vegetation becomes somewhat sub-tropic, with a lot of evergreens in the forest and tea plantations everywhere on the slopes.

South of the Pontic watershed the climate immediately gets drier. In the mountains first Abies nordmanniana, but then soon Pinus becomes dominant. In the western parts of Anatolia this is often Black Pine (Pinus nigra), in the east nearly exclusively Scotts Pine (Pinus sylvestris). Penetrating further into the central parts of inner Anatolia leads to still dryer, wintercold conditions. Today the lower parts of central Anatolia are virtually treeless. Fields on deep alluvial soils alternate with steppe on the dryer hills. But it is still an open question where and to what degree this central Anatolian steppe is due to aridity or to human deforestation. Aridity is most pronounced around Tuz Gölü south of Ankara and in the Aras-valley near the Armenian border. Between Kağizman and Tuzluca this valley is so dry, that here and there pure salt deposits glitter like white snowfields on the bare slopes.

The Taurus Mountains form the southern edge of the central Anatolian Plateau and are already very influenced by the Mediterranean, with a lot of snow in winter, but dry and warm summers. Climax forests are formed by Black Pine, Cilician Fir (Abies cilicica) and Lebanon Cedar (Cedrus libani). Unfortunately, there has been a lot of deforestation in the Taurus, most gravely affecting the stands of Cedrus.
On the Aegean and Mediterranean coasts pronounced Mediterranean conditions prevail, with very hot and dry summers and very rainy winters. Antalya Province has considerably more total precipitation than, for example, the south of England (1071 mm versus 759 mm), but its seasonal distribution is completely different and the average temperature is of course much higher (18.3 °C versus 9.7°). Such conditions favour the growth of hard-leaved evergreen trees such as Kermes Oak (Quercus coccifera) and Turkish Pine (Pinus brutia). But due to massive forest destruction hills and slopes in coastal West and South Anatolia are nowadays mostly covered with macchie. Where fertile alluvial soils prevail, e.g. in the Cilician Plain around Adana, there is intense agriculture.

See also
Climate change in Turkey
Flora of Turkey, Apocynaceae
Flora of Turkey, Betulaceae
Flora of Turkey, Fagaceae

External links
Plant List and Maps (bizimbitkiler.org.tr)
New e-Flora PDFs Work-in-Progress (Türkiye e-Florası)
Primary National Plant Gallery and Breaking News (turkiyebitkileri.com)
Primary National Botany ID Forum (FB)
Primary National Orchid ID Forum (FB)

References 

AVCI. M. 2005. "Çeşitlilik Ve Endemizm Açısından Türkiye’nin Bitki Örtüsü-Diversity and endemism in Turkey's Vegetation", İstanbul Üniversitesi Edebiyat Fakültesi Coğrafya Bölümü Coğrafya Dergisi 13:27-55.

Information for this article was taken mainly from: Flowers of Turkey - a photo guide.- 448 pp.– Eigenverlag Gerhard Pils (2006).

Further basic literature about Turkish Flora and Vegetation:
 DAVIS, P. H. ed. 1965-1988: Flora of Turkey and the East Aegean Islands, 10 vols.− Edinburgh: University Press.
 GÜNER, A. & al. 2000: Flora of Turkey Supplement 2 [= vol 11].− Edinburgh: University Press.
 KREUTZ, D.A.J. 1998: Die Orchideen der Türkei, 766 pp.− Landgraaf (NL): Selbstverlag.
 MAYER, H. & AKSOY, H. 1986: Wälder der Türkei.– Stuttgart & New York: G. Fischer Verlag. Contents as pdf
 KÜRSCHNER, H., RAUS, T. & VENTER, J. 1995: Pflanzen der Türkei. Ägäis - Taurus - Inneranatolien.− Wiesbaden: Quelle & Meyer. Contents as pdf
 PILS, G., 2013: Endemism in Mainland Regions – Case Studies: Turkey.- p. 240-255 in: HOBOHM, C. (Ed.): Endemism in Vascular Plants.- Springer Verlag 
 SORGER, F. 1994: Blumen der Türkei.− Stapfia (Linz) 34. [pdf, 21,54Mb]
 TURKISH JOURNAL OF BOTANY

 
Biodiversity
Deforestation in Turkey